The 1963 Icelandic Cup was the fourth edition of the National Football Cup.

It took place between 10 August 1963 and 6 October 1963, with the final played at Melavöllur in Reykjavik. Teams from the Úrvalsdeild karla (1st division) did not enter until the quarter finals. In prior rounds, teams from the 2. Deild (2nd division), as well as reserve teams, played in one-legged matches. In case of a draw, the match was replayed.

For the fourth consecutive year, KR Reykjavik reached the final, beating IA Akranes 4 - 1.

First round

Second round 
 Entrance of þrottur Reykjavik, ÍBV Vestmannaeyjar, ÍB Hafnarfjörður and Fram Reykjavik B.

Third round

Quarter finals 
 Entrance of 6 clubs from 1. Deild

Semi finals

Final

See also 

 1963 Úrvalsdeild
 Icelandic Cup

External links 
 1963 Icelandic Cup results at the site of the Icelandic Football Federation 

Icelandic Men's Football Cup
Iceland
1963 in Iceland